Allan Archibald Parkhill (22 April 1912 – 26 August 1986) was a New Zealand rugby union player. He played 10 matches for the All Blacks including six internationals, scoring three tries in all.

Parkhill died in Dunedin on 26 August 1986, and his ashes were buried at Andersons Bay Cemetery.

References

1912 births
1986 deaths
People from Palmerston, New Zealand
People educated at East Otago High School
New Zealand rugby union players
New Zealand international rugby union players
Otago rugby union players
Canterbury rugby union players
Rugby union number eights
Burials at Andersons Bay Cemetery
Rugby union players from Otago